Põrstõ is a village in Setomaa Parish, Võru County in Estonia.

References

Villages in Võru County